KACV may refer to:

 KACV-FM, a radio station (89.9 FM) licensed to Amarillo, Texas, United States
 KACV-TV, a television station (channel 8) licensed to Amarillo, Texas, United States
 the ICAO code for Arcata-Eureka Airport